Olivia Thomas (born 3 May 2004) is an English cricketer who currently plays for Lancashire. She plays as a right-arm leg break bowler.

Early life
Thomas was born on 3 May 2004 in Manchester.

Domestic career
Thomas made her county debut in 2019, for Lancashire against Nottinghamshire. She played four matches in her first season, and took 3 wickets at an average of 29.00 in the 2019 Women's County Championship.

In 2020, Thomas played for North West Thunder in the Rachael Heyhoe Flint Trophy. She appeared in three matches, taking 1 wicket, which came against Central Sparks.

In 2022, she played six matches for Lancashire in the 2022 Women's Twenty20 Cup, taking five wickets at an average of 19.40.

References

External links

2004 births
Living people
Cricketers from Manchester
Lancashire women cricketers
North West Thunder cricketers